During World War II, Operation Diplomat was an Allied naval training operation. It was executed in March 1944 by the British Eastern Fleet to practice operational procedures that would be used by ships allocated to the British Pacific Fleet.

Part of the Eastern Fleet left Trincomalee and Colombo on 21 March and arrived at a point some 850 miles south of Ceylon (now Sri Lanka). They rendezvoused, on 24 March, with three tankers escorted by the Dutch cruiser  and practised refuelling at sea for the next two days. Later, on 27 March, they met up with the US Task Group 58.5 which consisted of the aircraft carrier  and her three attendant destroyers (and ).

The joint fleet returned to Trincomalee, and British Fleet Air Arm aircrew took two intensive days to learn the necessary procedures from American aircrews and learn from their experience. Sources differ on the exact dates of these events. Williams, in the History of HMS Ceylon, states that the joint fleet returned to Trincomalee on 2 April, whereas  Journal ibid, quotes 31 March.

External sources
 Career of HMS Ceylon, Jack Williams which shares text with A Warship called HMS Ceylon by Richard Boyle published by The Sunday Times.
 Operational history of New Zealand cruisers (from The Royal New Zealand Navy, Sydney David Waters, Historical Publications Branch, Wellington. (Part of: The Official History of New Zealand in the Second World War 1939–1945)
 USN history of USS Saratoga

Military operations of World War II
Naval battles and operations of World War II involving the United Kingdom